

Codes

References

Z